Giovanni Berlucchi is an Italian physiologist, academic, and author. He is a professor Emeritus at the Department of Neurosciences, Biomedicine, and Movement Sciences at the University of Verona.

Biography
Berlucchi was born in the Lombard city of Pavia on 25 May 1935, to Carlo Berlucchi, a clinical neurologist, and Elsa Baraldi.

After earning a degree in medicine from the University of Pavia in 1959, Berlucchi began his scientific and academic career at the University of Pisa under the neurophysiologist Giuseppe Moruzzi. From 1964 to 1965 he did postdoctoral work at the California Institute of Technology as a fellow of the U.S. National Health Institute and under Roger Wolcott Sperry who introduced him to the corpus callosum and to the functions of the brain hemispheres. In 1968 he joined as a research associate the Department of Anatomy of the University of Pennsylvania chaired by James M. Sprague. After becoming a full professor of physiology at the University of Siena in 1975, he occupied the same position at the University of Pisa from 1976 to 1983 and at the University of Verona from 1983 until retirement in 2010.

Following an initial involvement in the physiological study of the sleep-wake cycle, Berlucchi's research work has centered on the neural bases of cognition and behavior, with personal contributions to such fields as the interactions and functional differences between the cerebral hemispheres, vision and visuospatial attention, and the representation of the body by the brain. He has also conducted research on the historical development of neuropsychology and particularly of the neuroscientific thinking about cerebral organization and its plasticity.

Berlucchi has held several editorial appointments, including the editor-in-chief of Neuropsychologia, from 1993 to 1998. He was among the founders of the European Neuroscience Association and its journal, The European Journal of Neuroscience. He has co-authored the book Neurofobia with Salvatore Aglioti. He has contributed to many handbooks including Handbook of Sensory Physiology, Handbook of Psychobiology, Handbook of Clinical and Experimental Neuropsychology, Handbook of Clinical Neurology.

Berlucchi is a national fellow of Accademia Nazionale dei Lincei and an elected member of Academia Europaea from 1990. He is a member of several other scientific and cultural institutions, including the Accademia Nazionale Virgiliana, the Istituto Lombardo di Scienze Lettere ed Arti and the Istituto Veneto di Scienze Lettere ed Arti. His autobiography is published in The History of Neuroscience in Autobiography, a book series of the Society for Neuroscience.

Awards and honors
1963 – Prize of the Società Italiana di Elettroencefalografia e Neurofisiologia clinica
1971 – Annual Lecture, European Brain and Behaviour Society
1972 – Elected Member, International Neuropsychology Symposium
1990 – Elected Member, Academia Europaea
1992 – Elected Member, Accademia dei Lincei
2001 – Caruso Prize of the Società italiana di Neurofisiologia clinica
2001 – Herlitzka Prize for Physiology, Accademia delle Scienze di Torino
2007 – Honorary degree in psychology, University of Pavia
2010 – Triennal Prize, Literary Society of Verona
2014 – Eranos-Jung Lecture, Monte Verità Ascona
2015 – Prize for a Career in Cognitive Neuroscience, Università Cattolica

Bibliography

Books
Handbook of Sensory Physiology (1973) 
Handbook of Psychobiology (1975) 
Encyclopaedia of Ignorance (1977) 
Structure and Functions of the Cerebral Commissures (1979) 

Handbook of Neuropsychology (2003) 

Handbook of Clinical and Experimental Neuropsychology (1999) 
Handbook of Clinical Neurology (2007) ISBN 978044464150
Encyclopedia of Neuroscience (2009) 

Neurofobia (2013)

Selected articles
G. Berlucchi, M.S. Gazzaniga, G. Rizzolatti. Microelectrode analysis of transfer of visual information by the corpus callosum. Archives italiennes de Biologie, 105:583–596, 1967
G. Berlucchi, G. Rizzolatti. Binoculary driven neurons in visual cortex of split chiasm cats. Science, 159:308–310, 1968
G. Rizzolatti, C. Umiltà, G. Berlucchi. Opposite superiorities of the right and left cerebral hemispheres in discriminative reaction time to physiognomical and alphabetical material. Brain, 94:431–442, 1971.
G. Berlucchi, J.M. Sprague. The cerebral cortex in visual learning and memory, and in interhemispheric transfer in the cat. In: F.O. Schmitt, F.G. Worden, G. Adelman and J.G. Dennis (eds): The organization of the cerebral cortex, pp. 415–440. The MIT Press, Cambridge, Mass., 1981.
G. Berlucchi, A. Antonini. The role of the corpus callosum in the representation of the visual field in cortical areas. In: Brain Circuits and Functions of the Mind (C.B. Trevarthen, ed.), Cambridge, Cambridge University Press, pp. 129–139, 1990.
G. Berlucchi, R.W. Sperry. Il cervello diviso. Sfera, 12: 66–69, 1990.
G. Berlucchi, S. Aglioti. The body in the brain: Neural bases of corporeal awareness. Trends in Neurosciences, 20: 560–564, 1997.
G. Berlucchi. Inhibition of return: A phenomenon in search of a mechanism and a better name. Cognitive Neuropsychology, 23: 1065–1074, 2006.
M. Glickstein, G. Berlucchi. Classical disconnection studies of the corpus callosum. Cortex, 44: 914–927, 2008.
G. Berlucchi, H.A. Buchtel. Neuronal plasticity: historical roots and evolution of meaning. Experimental Brain Research, 192: 307–319, 2009.
G. Berlucchi, S.M. Aglioti. The body in the brain revisited. Experimental Brain Research, 200: 25–35, 2010.
M.C. Corballis, P.M. Corballis, G. Berlucchi, C.A. Marzi. Perceptual unity in the split brain: the role of subcortical connections. Brain 2018 Jun 1;141(6): e46-47.
G. Berlucchi, C.A. Marzi. Neuropsychology of Consciousness: Some History and a Few New Trends. Frontiers in Psychology, 2019 Jan 30;10:50.

References

1935 births
Living people
Italian neuroscientists
Italian physiologists
University of Pavia alumni
University of Pisa alumni
Academic staff of the University of Siena
Academic staff of the University of Pisa
Academic staff of the University of Verona
Members of the Lincean Academy
Members of Academia Europaea
Scientific journal editors